Lancaster's Loire campaign was the march south from Brittany in August 1356 by an English army led by Henry, Duke of Lancaster. He was attempting to join the army of Edward, the Black Prince, near Tours. The French had broken the bridges over the River Loire and Lancaster was forced to turn back, returning to Brittany in September.

Chevauchée 

In August 1356 Henry, Duke of Lancaster, marched south from eastern Brittany with an army of unknown size. It took the form of a large-scale mounted raid (a ). It was his intention to join the army of Edward, the Black Prince, the eldest son of the English king, Edward III. This had marched north from Bergerac on 8 August. It was planned that the two would meet in the general vicinity of Tours. Lancaster brought with him from Normandy 2,500 men. He also had under his command over 2,000 men garrisoning the English-held fortifications of Brittany. The extent to which he added the men from these garrisons to the troops he brought with him is not known.

Due to the unseasonable fullness of the River Loire, across which the French had destroyed or strongly fortified all the bridges, Lancaster was unable to effect a junction. In early September he abandoned the attempt to force a crossing at Les Ponts-de-Cé and returned to Brittany. En route he captured and garrisoned a substantial number of French strongpoints. Once in Brittany he laid siege to its capital, Rennes.

The Prince also returned towards his starting point, but his delay waiting for Lancaster near Tours enabled a French army under the command of their king, John II to overtake him. As a result the Prince was forced to commit to the Battle of Poitiers, where the French were heavily defeated.

Citations and sources

Citations

Sources

 
 
 
 

 

 

1356 in England
1350s in France
Battles of the Hundred Years' War
Conflicts in 1356
Hundred Years' War, 1337–1360
Military campaigns involving England